"Dare not to sleep" is a poem written by Arnulf Øverland. The poem was first published in the magazine Samtiden in 1936, and included in the poetry collection Den Røde Front from 1937.

It is about the Nazism and Fascism's onward march in Europe – a warning against indifference, human contempt and a warning against what would happen. In this poem Øverland mentions Hitler by name, and says:

Footnotes 

Norwegian poems
1936 poems
Works originally published in Norwegian magazines
Works originally published in literary magazines
Works originally published in political magazines